The Worcester IceCats were a US ice hockey team in the American Hockey League. They played in Worcester, Massachusetts, at the Worcester Centrum. In 2005 the team was renamed the Peoria Rivermen and moved to Peoria, Illinois.

History
The IceCats got their start when original New York Islanders owner Roy Boe purchased the Springfield Indians AHL franchise and moved it to Worcester in the summer of 1994. The team began play in the Fall of 1994 with a collection of free-agent players but as yet with no National Hockey League team affiliation. Late in the 1994–95 season, Boe and head coach/General Manager Jim Roberts negotiated a deal with the St. Louis Blues. From that point on the IceCats would be the Blues' premier minor league team. The Peoria Rivermen of the East Coast Hockey League, in turn, became the IceCats' minor league affiliate in 1998, having been with St. Louis before the 1994 Worcester deal. During the 2000–01 season, Boe sold the IceCats to the St. Louis Blues. The team celebrated its tenth season in the AHL in fall 2003.

On November 9, 2004, the St. Louis Blues announced the sale of the IceCats to the owners of their ECHL affiliate, the Peoria Rivermen. The new owners moved the franchise to Peoria, Illinois, for the 2005–06 season.

This franchise was previously known as: Springfield Indians (1926–1994)
The franchise became known as: Peoria Rivermen (2005–2013)
This franchise was replaced by: Worcester Sharks (2006–2015)

Affiliates
 New York Islanders (1995-1996)
 Ottawa Senators (1996–1998)
 St. Louis Blues (1995–2005)

Season-by-season results

Regular season

Playoffs

† Lost in preliminary round.

Team records

Single season
Goals: 38 Eric Boguniecki and Justin Papineau (2001–2002)
Assists: 46 Eric Boguniecki (2001–2002)
Points: 84 Eric Boguniecki (2001–2002)
Penalty minutes: 337 Sylvain Blouin (1999–2000)
GAA: 2.13 Curtis Sanford (2003–2004)
SV%: 0.929 Dwayne Roloson (2000–2001)

Career
Career goals: 79 Marc Brown
Career assists: 154 Terry Virtue
Career points: 210 Terry Virtue
Career penalty minutes: 1083 Terry Virtue
Career goaltending wins: 65 Curtis Sanford
Career shutouts: 10 Curtis Sanford
Career games: 455 Terry Virtue

Franchise scoring leaders

These are the top ten point-scorers in IceCat's franchise history.

''Note: Pos = Position; GP = Games played; G = Goals; A = Assists; Pts = Points;

Team captains
 Jim Nesich, 1994–1995
 Roy Mitchell, 1995–1996
 David Williams, 1996–1997
 Terry Virtue, 1997–1998
 Ricard Persson, 1997–1998
 Geoff Smith, 1998–1999
 Jason Widmer, 1998–2000
 Bryan Helmer, 1999–2000
 Ed Campbell, 2000–2002
 Eric Nickulas, 2002–2003
 Jeff Panzer, 2003–2004
 Mike Mottau, 2004–2005

Notable IceCats

References

External links
The Internet Hockey Database - Worcester IceCats

 
1994 establishments in Massachusetts
2005 disestablishments in Massachusetts
Defunct sports teams in Massachusetts
Ice hockey clubs established in 1994
Ice hockey clubs disestablished in 2005
Ice hockey teams in Worcester, Massachusetts
Ottawa Senators minor league affiliates